Henry Hall (1810 – 1 December 1864) was an English cricketer who played first-class cricket from 1827 to 1837.  Hall played for Sheffield Cricket Club and made 14 known appearances in first-class matches.  He represented the North in the North v. South series.

References

1810 births
1864 deaths
English cricketers
English cricketers of 1826 to 1863
Sheffield Cricket Club cricketers
North v South cricketers
Cricketers from Sheffield